Mundi Area (Hindi: मूंदी क्षेत्र) is an area of the Khandwa District in the Madhya Pradesh state of central India. The city of Mundi is the administrative headquarters of the area.

Geography
Mundi Area has a population 1 lakh (2011 census). Mundi Area lies in the Nimar region, which includes the lower valley of the Narmada River, Kherkhali River, and Shiva River. The Narmada forms part of the northern boundary of the Mundi Area and the Khandwa area to the south, the Barwaha and Sanawad areas to the west, and the Harsud area to the east.

Demographics
According to the 2011 census, Mundi Area has a population of 1 lakh. Its population growth rate from 2001–2011 was 21.44%. East Nimar has 944 females for every 1000 males, and a literacy rate of 75%.

Languages
Mundi Area people speak English, Hindi, or Nimadi. Most village people speak Nimadi and write in the Devanagari script.

Famous people
Saint Singaji, a great poet and saint, lived here. He was born in the fifteenth century to a poor gavali (herdsman) family of Khajuri village. He later moved to Piplia village, where he met Saint Manrangeer and dedicated his life to God. He practiced the Nirguna sect of the Hindu religion and became the object of wide popular devotion, especially among the gavalis of the Nimar districts. A fair is held in his holy memory every year on Sharad Purnima at his samadhi place, Piplia-Singaji. Devotees come from many villages in and around the area to gather near his temple, where they offer puja to Singaji Maharaj and sing his bhajans.

External links

Khandwa district